Bulbophyllum weddelii (Weddel's bulbophyllum) is a species of orchid.

weddelii